R. Eswaran is an Indian politician and former Member of the Legislative Assembly. He was elected to the Tamil Nadu legislative assembly  from Vasudevanallur constituency, which is reserved for candidates from the Scheduled Castes, in the 1984, 1989, and 1991 elections as an Indian National Congress candidate. He then won the same seat in 1996 and 2001 as a Tamil Maanila Congress (Moopanar) candidate.

Before becoming an MLA he took charge as the President of Ramanathapuram Panchayat in Tirunelveli District.

He has 5 daughters and 1 son.

References 

Indian National Congress politicians from Tamil Nadu
Living people
Tamil Maanila Congress politicians
Tamil Nadu MLAs 1996–2001
Tamil Nadu MLAs 1985–1989
Tamil Nadu MLAs 2001–2006
Year of birth missing (living people)
Tamil Nadu MLAs 1991–1996